Nubri (Tibetan: ནུབ་རི) is a Tibeto-Burman language spoken by about 2000 ethnically Tibetan people living in Nubri Valley in northern Central Nepal, upper Gorkhā District of Gandaki Province. Nubri has at least three dialects as typified by the Prok, Lho and Sama village varieties. Nubri is largely undocumented and undescribed, with the exception of a lexicon. Nubri is perhaps most closely related to neighbouring Tsum language and the Kyirong variety of Tibetan spoken just across the border in Tibet. It has also been claimed to be closely related to Gyalsumdo. Like these languages it is tonal and shares many Tibetic grammatical features, but is uniquely different in many ways.

The Nubri language project started in 2017 at the University of Hong Kong (HKU) with the aim of studying and documenting this language. Recent work includes studies of the case marking and tone as well as a valley-wide sociolinguistic survey which confirmed its classification as "definitely endangered."
Building from this, a recent effort towards language maintenance involved initiating community discussions about a writing system for Nubri. This was carried out in May 2019 in conjunction with a cataract clinic funded by the same HKU Knowledge Exchange grant (PI Cathryn Donohue).

References 

Languages of Nepal
Sino-Tibetan languages
Tibeto-Burman languages
Bodish languages
Definitely endangered languages